The Christmas Guest: Stories and Songs of Christmas is a Country/Gospel/Christian album by Andy Griffith. It was released on September 30, 2003 by Sparrow Records. The album combines traditional Christmas stories with Griffith's interpretations of several holiday classics.

Track listing 

 "The Christmas Guest" (Story) (Grandpa Jones, Bill Walker) – 5:33
 "Joy to the World" – 2:04
 "O Come, O Come, Emmanuel"/"What Child Is This?" – 3:36
 "Jesus' Birth in Bethlehem, Luke 2" (Story) – 3:23
 "Go Tell It on the Mountain" – 2:19
 "Away in a Manger"/"Golden Slumber" – 3:16
 "Beautiful Savior" – 2:49
 "The Juggler" (Story) (Larry Paxton, Kristin Wilkinson) – 6:56
 "I Wonder as I Wander" – 2:58
 "Jesus Walked That Lonesome Valley" – 3:10
 "Belleau Wood" (Story) (Garth Brooks, Joel Henry) – 1:52
 "Silent Night" – 3:00

Chart performance

Awards 

In 2004, the album was nominated for a Dove Award for Country Album of the Year at the 35th GMA Dove Awards.

References

External links 
 The Christmas Guest on Amazon

2003 albums
Andy Griffith albums
Sparrow Records albums
2003 Christmas albums
Christmas albums by American artists
Country Christmas albums